South Lake is a neighborhood in Pasadena, California. It is Pasadena's premier shopping district and home to the California Institute of Technology. South Lake is bordered by Colorado Boulevard to the north, the Pasadena–San Marino border to the south, Hudson Avenue to the west, and Hill Avenue to the east.

Landmarks
The shops on the east side of South Lake Avenue are notable for being accessible from the street and from Shoppers' lane, a half-mile long alleyway that runs alongside Lake Avenue. Also located on Lake Avenue is a large Macy's department store built in early 1940s modern architecture. At the center of the neighborhood is Caltech, Grant Park, and Tournament Park.

Education
South Lake is served by Hamilton Elementary School, McKinley School, Wilson Middle School, and Blair High School. Polytechnic School and St. Philip the Apostle School are private schools in the area.

Transportation
South Lake is served by Metro Local lines 177, 267 and 662. It is also served by Pasadena Transit routes 10 and 20.

Notable residents
Due to the location of Caltech, South Lake has been home to many in the scientific community.
Albert Einstein, physicist
Robert A. Millikan, physicist
Jack Parsons, rocket scientist
Amos G. Throop, Caltech founder, former Mayor of Pasadena.
Fritz Zwicky, astronomer

Neighborhoods in Pasadena, California